Juan Pablo Cabaña (born 28 December 2001) is an Argentine footballer currently playing as a forward for Boca Juniors.

Career statistics

Club

References

2001 births
Living people
Footballers from Córdoba, Argentina
Argentine footballers
Association football forwards
Argentine Primera División players
Boca Juniors footballers